Towerspring (initially Tower Spring) is a ghost town in Lincoln County, Kansas, United States.

History
Tower Spring was issued a post office in 1879. The post office was renamed Towerspring in 1894, then discontinued in 1904.

References

Former populated places in Lincoln County, Kansas
Former populated places in Kansas